Bosniak –  (endonym form), may refer to:

 Bosniak (ethnonym) – , a South Slavic ethnonym, designating a Bosniak as a person of Bosniak ethnicity
 Bosniak (demonym) – , a South Slavic demonym, designating a Bosniak as a person from the region of Bosnia
 Bošnjak (demonym) – , a South Slavic archaic demonym, designating a Bosniak as a person from Medieval Bosnia
 Bosniak language, variant designation for language of ethnic Bosniaks
 Bosniak nationalism, designation for nationalism of ethnic Bosniaks
 Bosniak National Council, political organization of ethnic Bosniaks, in Serbia
 Bosniak entity, a proposed political entity of ethnic Bosniaks, in Bosnia and Herzegovina
 Bosniak Democratic Party of Sandžak, political party of ethnic Bosniaks, in Serbia
 Bosniak Party, political party of ethnic Bosniaks in Montenegro
 Bosniak Muslims, ethnic Bosniaks who are adherents of Islam
 Bosniak Institute, an institution in Sarajevo, Bosnia and Herzegovina
 Bosniak Corps, designation for a military unit in Prussian army (18th century)
 Bosniak-Croatian War, war between ethnic Bosniacs and Croats in Bosnia and Herzegovina (1992–1994)
 Bosniak-Croatian Federation, colloquial term for the Federation of Bosnia and Herzegovina, created in 1994
 Bosniak classification of kidney cysts, a medical term, named after Morton Bosniak

- endonym forms used in English language:
 Bošnjak (surname), a South Slavic surname found mostly in Bosnia and Herzegovina, Croatia, Montenegro and Serbia
 Bošnjak, Petrovac, a village near Petrovac, in Serbia
 Mali Bošnjak, a village near Koceljeva, in Serbia

See also
 Bosniaks (disambiguation)
 Bosnians (disambiguation)
 Bosnian (disambiguation)
 Bosnia (disambiguation)
 Name of Bosnia